Dialypetalanthus is a genus of trees in the family Rubiaceae. It only contains one species, Dialypetalanthus fuscescens, which is found in Bolivia, Brazil and Peru.

References 

Monotypic Rubiaceae genera
Enigmatic Rubiaceae taxa
Dialypetalantheae
Trees of Bolivia
Trees of Brazil
Trees of Peru